2-Methylheptane is a branched alkane isomeric to octane. Its structural formula is (CH3)2CH(CH2)4CH3.

References

External links

Chemical and physical properties table

Alkanes